The Voices Of Patti Page is a Patti Page LP album, issued by Mercury Records as catalog number MG-20100.

Billboard reviewed the album on July 7, 1956 saying: “Outstanding feature of this recap of a dozen of the thrush’s singles is amazingly accurate reproduction of Patti Page’s multi-voice technique. The waxing is a beautiful piece of work from start to finish, and including, as it does, “Doggie in the Window” (her old smash hit single), “Milwaukee Polka,” “Changing Partners” and “Crazy Quilt,” a sound item for counter inventory. Thrush's current national TV spot on CBS should also help sales.”

References

Patti Page albums
Mercury Records albums
1956 albums